After the assassination of Francisco Pizarro, in retaliation for his father's execution in 1538, Diego de Almagro II, El Mozo, continued to press claims as the rightful ruler of Peru and as leader of his father's supporters. His claims were largely unsuccessful, however, as Pizarro was succeeded as governor by Cristóbal Vaca de Castro, despite claims from his brother Gonzalo Pizarro, whose claims to join arms against the Almagristas and "El Mozo" largely remained unanswered.

The battle
Desperate not to face the same fate as his father after the battle of Las Salinas, Diego de Almagro II gathered an army of supporters.  Vaca de Castro met and defeated de Almagro's army outside Huamanga (Ayacucho) at Chupas, on 16 September 1542, the year following Pizarro's murder.  1200 Spaniards fought in the battle.  Vaca de Castro's forces killed 200 Almagristas, and hanged many more later that day. De Almagro fled to Cuzco and tried to seek refuge at Manco Inca's residence in Vitcos. But he was caught and was executed on the city plaza of Cuzco after a brief trial.

References

Chupas
Chupas
Chupas 1542
Chupas
History of Ayacucho Region
1542 in the Spanish Empire
1542 in the Inca civilization